Cloroform is a Norwegian alternative rock band that formed in 1998 in Stavanger. They started out as an acoustic jazz trio, but soon went on to sound more like a rock band. In the later years they have experimented with noise and avant-garde related genres.

Other projects 
The members of Cloroform are three  versatile musicians. In addition to Cloroform they have several other projects on their hands.

Børge Fjordheim has been co-producer and contributor as composer on several of Norway's leading pop acts, such as Sivert Høyem, Morten Abel and Lene Marlin. He has also co-composed and produced the song "Can't Beat the Feeling" on Kylie Minogue album Aphrodite, released in 2010.

Øyvind Storesund is one of Norway's most respected free-jazz avant-garde bassists, and is the bassplayer of Kaizers Orchestra.

John Erik Kaada has released solo albums and is one of Norway's most renowned composers. He has scored several international motion pictures.

Discography 
 Deconstruction (Kaada Records, 1998)
 All-Scars (Kaada Records, 1998)
 Do the Crawl (Kaada Records, 2000)
 Scrawl (Kaada Records, 2001)
 Hey You Let's Kiss (Kaada Records, 2003)
 Cracked Wide Open (Kaada Records, 2005)
 Clean (Kaada Records, 2007)
 Grrr (Kaada Records, 2016)
 Overtredelse (Mirakel, 2021)

References

External links 
 
 http://www.kaada.no

Norwegian alternative rock groups
Acid jazz ensembles
Electronica music groups
Noise musical groups
Norwegian musical trios
Musical groups established in 1998
1998 establishments in Norway
Musical groups from Stavanger